The Aleph Institute is an American non-profit organization affiliated with the Chabad-Lubavitch  movement that provides support services to the approximately 85,000 Jews in the U.S. prison system and Jewish members of the U.S. military located in the United States and deployed abroad.

Prison programs
Aleph's prison programs focus on assisting Jewish inmates during their prison stay as well as helping them reintegrate into society once released. Aleph helps them observe the Jewish holidays and assist them with their daily Jewish practices, books, food items and materials holidays and daily Jewish practices. Aleph also has a summer visitation program which sends Rabbinical students around the US visiting over 3,000 Jewish inmates.

Advocacy
The institute has intervened on behalf of Jewish prisoners, in the United States and abroad. For example, the institute connected Jacob Ostreicher, a Jewish businessman arrested in Bolivia in 2011 for purportedly money laundering, with actor Sean Penn. Penn made a direct appeal to Bolivian President Evo Morales on Ostreicher's behalf. Ostreicher was released in 2013 and credited the Aleph Institute with helping to secure his release.

In 2010, Aleph Institute joined 200 Jewish organizations petitioning then Governor Charlie Christ for a stay of execution on behalf of Martin Grossman who was convicted of the 1984 killing of a law enforcement officer. Pope Benedict XVI also sent a personal request to commute the sentence but the execution proceeded and Grossman was killed in 2010.

Military programs
Aleph assists with the spiritual needs of Jews serving in the U.S. Armed Forces by providing Jewish books as well as moral and spiritual support.  Aleph also distributes special holiday packages to soldiers for Jewish holidays to Army, Navy, Air Force and Marine bases.

References

External links
 

Military-related organizations
Prison charities based in the United States
Jewish charities based in the United States
Charities based in Florida
Chabad organizations
Religious prison-related organizations
Chabad in the United States
Surfside, Florida